Hour record of France is the hour record, longest distance cycled in one hour on a bicycle from a stationary start, held by a French cyclist since 1893. Cyclists attempt this record alone on the track without other competitors present.

References

Hour record
Cycling records and statistics
Cycle racing in France